

List

References

A